Proviso means a conditional provision to an agreement. It may refer to
Proviso Township, Cook County, Illinois, United States
Proviso Township High Schools District 209 that comprises
Proviso East High School
Proviso West High School
Proviso Mathematics and Science Academy
Wilmot Proviso, an American law to ban slavery in annexed territory from Mexico proposed by David Wilmot in the 1840s 
Lockean proviso, a feature of John Locke's labour theory of property